Jeffrey D. Waldstreicher (born December 31, 1979) is an American politician from Maryland and a member of the Democratic Party. He is currently a member of the Maryland Senate, representing District 18 in Montgomery County after serving two terms in the Maryland House of Delegates.

Early life and career
Waldstreicher was born in Silver Spring, Maryland, on December 31, 1979. He graduated from Montgomery Blair High School and later attended Emory University, where he graduated Phi Beta Kappa with a Bachelor of Arts degree in political science and history. He received a Juris Doctor degree from the University of California, Berkeley in 2003, where he was an editor for the California Law Review.

In the legislature
Waldstreicher was sworn into the Maryland House of Delegates on January 10, 2007, where he served on the Judiciary Committee until 2015, and on the Economic Matters Committee from 2015 to 2019.

In July 2017, Waldstreicher announced his candidacy for the Maryland Senate in District 18, seeking to succeed state senator Richard Madaleno, who unsuccessfully ran for governor in 2018. Waldstriecher endorsed Madaleno in the gubernatorial primary, attending his campaign launch rally. In March 2018, he was accused of encouraging Helga Luest to run for his seat in the Maryland House of Delegates to make it harder for his primary challenger, Dana Beyer, to win the Democratic primary. Waldstreicher denied Luest's allegations in a statement sent to Bethesda Magazine, but did not comment further. His opponents also accused him of dodging candidate events, which Waldstreicher said he missed because of a sickness and legislative duties. Waldstreicher won the Democratic primary on June 26, 2018, defeating Beyer with 49.4 percent of the vote. He ran unopposed in the general election.

He was sworn into the Maryland Senate on January 9, 2019, where he serves as the vice-chair of the Judicial Proceedings Committee and the Chair of the Joint Committee on Federal Relations. In February 2019, President of the Maryland Senate Bill Ferguson appointed Waldstreicher to a work group to study legalizing recreational marijuana in the state.

Waldstreicher ran for re-election to the Maryland Senate in 2022, and was challenged by progressive activist Max Socol in the Democratic primary. Socol accused Waldstreicher of weakening the Maryland Police Accountability Act during the 2021 legislative session and of again dodging candidate events during the primary, which Waldstreicher responded by saying he held two town halls during the Democratic primary and freely shares his personal cell phone number with constituents. Waldstreicher outraised Socol 4-to-1, was endorsed by the Montgomery County Education Association, the state Sierra Club, and Service Employees International Union Local 500, and received support from the Maryland Democratic Senate Caucus Committee. He won the Democratic primary on July 19, 2022, defeating Socol with 63.8 percent of the vote to Socol's 36.2 percent.

Personal life
Waldstreicher is married. Together, he and his wife have three children and live in Kensington, Maryland. They are active members of Temple Shalom in Chevy Chase, where Waldstreicher served on the Social Justice Committee and as a substitute Hebrew School teacher.

Political positions

Development initiatives
During the 2019 legislative session, Waldstreicher introduced a bill that would repeal the Maryland Court of Appeals' ruling in Dumbarton Improvement Association, Inc. v. Druid Ridge Cemetery Company, Inc., which blocked development at the Druid Ridge Cemetery in Baltimore County, Maryland. He withdrew the bill in March 2019 after The Baltimore Sun asked him questions about the measure, saying that he hadn't intended to get involved in a Baltimore County land-use issue. Waldstreicher later introduced a bill creating a state office to mediate lawsuits from workers with asbestos-related diseases, the bill unanimously passed the Maryland Senate and received a 96-36 vote in the Maryland House of Delegates, but did not become law.

Environment
During his tenure in the Maryland House of Delegates, Waldstreicher repeatedly introduced legislation that would block state subsidies from going to the Luke Mill, a paper mill that the state government had considered "green energy" despite it releasing carbon dioxide through the burning of black liquor.

National politics
In September 2018, Waldstreicher signed a letter calling on local police and prosecutors in Montgomery County to investigate allegations that U.S. Supreme Court nominee Brett Kavanaugh had committed sexual assault while attending Georgetown Preparatory School in the 1980s. The county's chief of police and state's attorney said shortly after that they were "prepared to investigate any allegation, should a victim come forward."

In September 2019, Waldstreicher joined Baltimore City, the town of Gaithersburg, Maryland, and a number of advocacy groups in a lawsuit against the Trump administration over its public charge rule toward granting green cards or permanent residency to certain immigrants using public benefits.

Policing
During the 2021 legislative session, Waldstreicher introduced amendments to a bill repealing the state's Law Enforcement Officers' Bill of Rights, seeking to clarify portions of alterations made by state senator Michael A. Jackson. These amendments led to a car rally organized by the Silver Spring Justice Coalition and the Montgomery County Defund/Invest Coalition outside of Waldstreicher's home and calls for Waldstreicher to be removed as vice chair of the Judicial Proceedings Committee.

Social issues
In November 2007, Waldstreicher voted against a bill that would allow voters to decide whether to legalize slot machine gambling in Maryland. The bill passed the Maryland House of Delegates by a vote of 86-52.

In October 2012, Waldstreicher attended a fundraiser event for Marylanders for Marriage Equality, a group supporting Question 6 to legalize same-sex marriage in Maryland.

In March 2013, Waldstreicher voted for a bill to repeal the death penalty in Maryland. The bill passed the Maryland House of Delegates by a vote of 82-56.

During the 2014 legislative session, Waldstreicher introduced a bill that would require police to obtain a search warrant to use drones, email, cellphone towers, or license plate readers to track people. The bill was signed into law by Governor Martin O'Malley on April 14, 2014.

During the 2016 legislative session, Waldstreicher introduced a bill that would prohibit restaurants banning customers from posting negative reviews online.

During the 2020 legislative session, Waldstreicher introduced "Olivia's Law", a bill that would require colleges and universities to create plans to address the outbreak of infectious diseases. The bill was named after Olivia Paregol, a University of Maryland freshman who died in 2018 after contracting adenovirus. The bill passed both  chambers unanimously and became law on May 8, 2020.

During the 2021 legislative session, Waldstreicher introduced the No Defense to Sexual Crimes Act, a bill that would repeal spousal privilege for sexual crimes. The bill passed both chambers by an unanimous vote in the Maryland Senate and a 115-18 vote in the Maryland House of Delegates, but failed to pass out of the General Assembly.

Transportation
Waldstreicher opposes the widening of Interstate 270 and the Capital Beltway.

During the 2022 legislative session, Waldstreicher introduced a bill prohibiting the state Motor Vehicle Administration from suspending motor vehicle registration as a penalty for toll violations.

Voting rights
During the 2019 legislative session, Waldstreicher introduced a bill that would allow eligible students to register to vote at high schools. The bill failed to pass out of the Committee on Education, Health, and Environmental Affairs.

Electoral history

References

External links
Official site at the Maryland General Assembly
 

1979 births
Living people
Emory University alumni
Democratic Party members of the Maryland House of Delegates
People from Silver Spring, Maryland
UC Berkeley School of Law alumni
21st-century American politicians
Democratic Party Maryland state senators